Lukman Saketi (born 20 March 1921) is an Indonesian former sports shooter. He competed in the 25 metre pistol event at the 1956 Summer Olympics and 1954 Asian Games.

References

External links
 

1921 births
Possibly living people
Indonesian male sport shooters
Olympic shooters of Indonesia
Shooters at the 1956 Summer Olympics
Place of birth missing (living people)
Asian Games medalists in shooting
Shooters at the 1954 Asian Games
Medalists at the 1954 Asian Games
Asian Games bronze medalists for Indonesia
20th-century Indonesian people